Fernet-Branca is an Italian brand of fernet, a style of amaro or bitters. It was formulated in Milan in 1845, and is manufactured there by Fratelli Branca Distillerie.

History 
Fernet-Branca was formulated in Milan in 1845 by a self-taught herbalist, Bernardino Branca, who with his sons set up a business to manufacture and sell it. It was marketed as a pick-me-up and as a cure for worms, for fever, for cholera and for menstrual pain. From 1886 the company published annual calendars with works by well-known artists. The eagle-and-globe logo was designed in 1893 by Leopoldo Metlicovitz.

The company began exporting to Argentina in 1907, and in 1925 established a distillery in Buenos Aires. In the United States the drink became popular after the passage of prohibition laws in 1919, as it was sold in pharmacies as a medicinal product. By 1936 Branca had set up a branch office in Tribeca, New York to satisfy American demand. Production in the United States peaked at 60,000 cases in 1960.

Formulation 

Fernet-Branca is produced according to the original recipe. It is made from 27 herbs and other ingredients; its complete formula is a trade secret. Sources have reported that its recipe includes chinese rhubarb, aloe ferox (bitter aloe), cinchona, chocolate, quinine and angelica. The Branca Distillery states on its web site that the drink contains "Rhubarb from China, Gentian from France, Galanga from India or from Sri Lanka, (and) Chamomile from Europe [or] Argentina", as well as linden (tiliae flos), iris, saffron, zedoary, myrrh and cinchona.

Fernet-Branca has a higher alcohol content, at 39%, and lower sugar content than most other amari. It is aged in oak barrels for a year.

The manufacturer also offers a sweeter, mint-flavored liqueur, Branca Menta.

Consumption

Fernet-Branca is often consumed neat as a digestif, typically served in a cordial glass, or as a mixing component (usually supportive and not as the primary ingredient) in cocktails such as the "Toronto", the "Fanciulli" and the "Hanky Panky".

In Argentina, Bolivia, Paraguay and Uruguay, fernet con coca—Fernet-Branca with Coca-Cola—is a popular drink. The cocktail is popular in Argentina, with some statistics reporting that the country consumes more than 75% of all fernet produced globally.

In the US it has been referred to as "The Bartender’s Handshake". Some 35% of all Fernet-Branca imported into the US is reportedly consumed in San Francisco.

Notes & references

External links

 

Bitters
Herbal liqueurs
Italian liqueurs
Patent medicines
Products introduced in 1845
Italian brands